Moon and Son is a British television astrological crime drama, created and produced by Robert Banks Stewart, that broadcast on BBC One from January 4, 1992.

The series was Martin's first British role in fifteen years, and was considered to be a "rare misfire" for creator Banks Stewart (who described this series as "a light-hearted thriller"), whose previous series Bergerac and Lovejoy had enjoyed significant success on British television.

Despite reports that the BBC had already commissioned a second series prior to the first series being broadcast, only thirteen episodes were made and the series was swiftly axed due to poor ratings, despite airing in a primetime Saturday evening slot. To date, the series has only been repeated once on Satellite TV, and has never been released on DVD.

Premise
The series starred Millicent Martin as clairvoyant and astrologer Gladys Moon, whose ability is more instinctive than psychic and John Michie as her psychic son, Trevor, who travel between Folkestone, England and France, conducting readings and selling occult and astrological goods from their mobile "Astral Centre Salon" called "Visions" and getting involved in various police investigations along the way.

Background
Alongside Martin and Michie, Laure Killing co-starred as Cecille Coulmier, Trevor's girlfriend. Other characters include the zany Zelda, a medium friend of Gladys' played by Anita Graham, Sergeant Eavis, played by Ian Redford, and Inspector Sardou, played by Patrick Drury.

The series was mostly filmed in Kent and France. A variety of locations were used for filming, including Folkestone, Kent and East Sussex Railway, Oare Marshes, Chilham Castle, Crabble Corn Mill, Dover, Deal, Folkestone Harbour, Dungeness Estate, The Grand Folkestone, The Leas Cliff Hall and The Romney, Hythe and Dymchurch Railway.

Christine Buttner of Ravensbourne University London acted as astrological adviser to the programme, emphasising the astrological elements of the storyline, with crystal balls, phrenological heads, hand reading and healing crystals.

Cast
 Millicent Martin as Gladys Moon
 John Michie as Trevor Moon 
 Laure Killing as Cecille Coulmier
 Anita Graham as Zelda Lee
 Ian Redford as Detective Sergeant Eavis
 Patrick Drury as Inspector Sardou

Episodes

References

External links

1990s British drama television series
1990s British television miniseries
1992 British television series debuts
1992 British television series endings
BBC television dramas
English-language television shows
Fictional duos
Folkestone
Television shows set in France
Television shows set in Kent
Television shows shot in Kent